Sangar Castle is a historical castle located in Esfarayen County in North Khorasan Province, The longevity of this fortress dates back to the Parthian Empire and Sasanian Empire.

References 

Castles in Iran
Parthian castles
Sasanian castles